The flathead sea catfish (Notarius planiceps) is a species of catfish in the family Ariidae. It was described by Franz Steindachner in 1876, originally under the genus Arius. It is currently ranked by the IUCN redlist as being of Least Concern, due to a lack of known major threats for the species.

The flathead sea catfish feeds off of benthic invertebrates. Its meat is marketed fresh.

References

Ariidae
Fish described in 1876